A , or a souvenir jacket, is a type of blouse jacket dating from the end of the Second World War. It is inspired by baseball jackets, and it uses embroidery, silk and Japanese influences.

History 

After the end of the Second World War, the remnants of the parachute capes were used by the American soldiers to create light jackets similar to teddy and varsity jackets and others inspired by the American universities. Upon leaving, they were decorated with motifs coming from the military inspiration, and then diversified with a mélange of Japanese and American culture, approximating the style to the tattoo technique.

A little after, the sukaman (portmanteau of Yokosuka-Mambo) fashion movement retook certain elements of civil style with military style of the military base of Yokosuka: the youths of this movement had one-button suits made by local tailors and sometimes went so far as to imitating American haircuts. They particularly appreciated souvenir jackets and gave them the name sukajan (from "Yokosuka jumpers"). This type of jacket ended up being marketed in the Yokosuka boutiques, for the passing sailors. The film Pigs and Battleships popularized the sukajan in the entire country and these jackets became the Japanese equivalent of greaser fashion for the "bad boys".

Afterwards, this type of jacket was transformed into a local classic: a souvenir object for tourists or a basic wardrobe element. In the 2010s, it was reinterpreted by fashion and various European designers who seized it to integrate it into their ready-to-wear collections.

Sometimes close to the silk bombers, adorned with tiger, snake or dragon motifs, the jacket paradoxically keeps the (visual) softness of the silk against the virile image of those who wear them.

 is another kind of sukajan, based on a military jacket such as the MA-1.Vietjan is adorned with maps of Vietnam as well as other motifs.

See also 

 Flight jacket
 Perfecto

References

Sources 

 
 

Embroidery
Silk
Tops (clothing)
Japanese upper-body garments
Pages with unreviewed translations